Heist is a one-off 2008 television comedy-drama, written by Peter Harness and directed by Justin Hardy. It was completed at the end of 2006 and first broadcast on 23 April 2008 on BBC Four as part of its Medieval season. Loosely based on real events surrounding Richard of Pudlicott, it is a parody of and/or homage to heist films, set in medieval England, using several of that genre's conventions (such as the raid being "one last job", and the use of an unintelligent but physically strong figure), and trailed under the same tagline as the 2003 remake of The Italian Job ("Get in, get out, get even"). As per the medieval setting, the film dialogue contains several Middle English and pseudo-Middle English  expressions and insults (some of which are translations of modern-English insults or rhyming slang - "mother-swyver" instead of "motherfucker", or "it's all gone a bit church gong" instead of "it's all gone a bit Pete Tong", for example). Marshall as lead character narrates several parts of the backstory to the audience during the film.

Plot 
In 1303, the innkeeper and would-be wool-merchant Dick Puddlecote is arrested and imprisoned in Flanders after travelling there from England to trade wool. Before he could receive the money, he was imprisoned, as punishment for the English monarch Edward I having defaulted on a loan from Flanders.

On his release, Dick returns to England, where he finds Edward has taken over his inn and forced his girlfriend Joanna the Concubine into prostitution.  Dick vows revenge on the King for all this, and begins to gather his friends to attempt an audacious robbery on the king's treasury beneath Westminster Abbey.

Reception 
 The Guardian - One critic called it unsubtle, and "Carry On in Ye Olde Worlde England...[or] Blackadder meets Bill and Ted meets Lock Stock and Two Smoking Barrels", adding that "It is very, very silly. It's also way too long. But I laughed out loud on several occasions" Another stated it was a "romp [that] seems to have stumbled in from BBC Three. In fact, were it not for the nudity and the swearing, it could easily sit on CBBC"
 The Telegraph - Its critic called it "an embarrassingly desperate attempt to demonstrate that Hey, Studying the Middle Ages Can Be Fun" and as having "not so much a naturally playful imagination as a teeth-gritted determination to appear wacky at all costs"
 The Independent - Despite "tiny traces of real history [remaining]" and "the odd good joke", its critic also criticised "its wearying dependency on the verb "swiving" " and argued that "even historical impurists may have hankered for a little more hard fact in among the "cack" jokes and the cinematic pranks"
 The Times - Its critic initially found "the mix of period and contemporary-speak .. irritating [and] the jerky camera and laddish bravura ... derivative", but did state that it had "some groovy conceits" and praised the cartoons and James's and Sumpter's performances.

Cast 
 Kris Marshall as Dick Puddlecote
 Geraldine James as Joanna
 Donald Sumpter as Edward I
 Michael Dunning as Ramage
 Bennet Warden as Irish Pete
 Paul Hilton as Warefield
 Linal Haft as Newmarket
 Tim Plester as Will

References

External links 
 
 
 

2008 television films
2008 films
Films set in the 14th century
Television series set in the 14th century
Television shows set in England
2008 television specials
British television films
British heist films
Cultural depictions of Edward I of England
2000s British films